Davy Ngoma Di Malonda (born August 28, 1992), better known by his stage name Da Uzi (sometimes stylized as DA Uzi and pronounced Dé-A Uzi), is a French rapper of Congolese origin (DRC).

Early years
Davy Ngoma Di Malonda was born in 1992 in Angers, Pays de la Loire.
He passed his early years until 11 years old in Villemomble and Villeparisis where he played football (soccer) in a local sports team. Then he moved to live with his aunts in a community in Seine-et-Marne, then a year at Poitiers where he enrolled in a football school. At fifteen, he moved to Trois Tours, Sevran, Paris Region.

He wanted a sports career playing football, but after an injury, he was dropped for treatment and spent the remaining of his short sports career in third level competition at his club before quitting altogether at 15. After that, he started rapping and taking part in rap competitions specially at Villeparisis.

Career
His beginnings in rap are still sketchy as he was imprisoned several times. But in 2016, he was noted for several freestyles efforts collected in the self-release La D en personne in 2017. At the end of that year, he was signed to Vrai2Vrai Industry and the rap label Rec 118, an affiliate of Warner Music. With the signing, he was featured in releases by of Sevran artists, including Maes and the 13 Block collective. His single with Ninho titled "Entre les murs" charted peaking at #62 on the SNEP French singles chart in 2018.

In 2019, DA Uzi released his mixtape Mexico that peaked at number 5 on the French Albums Chart in addition to 4 freestyle releases titled WeLaRue. His debut studio album Architecte was released on 3 April 2020 peaking at #1 in France, selling 9,700 copies in its first week of release, and eventually more than 50,000 copies and certified gold.  "Crois-moi" featuring is his highest charting single reaching #3 in France.

Discography

Albums

Mixtapes

Other releases
2014: Sans prétention Vol. 1 (self-published)

Singles

*Did not appear in the official Belgian Ultratop 50 charts, but rather in the bubbling under Ultratip charts.

Featured in

*Did not appear in the official Belgian Ultratop 50 charts, but rather in the bubbling under Ultratip charts.

Other charting songs

References

French rappers
1994 births
Living people
French people of Democratic Republic of the Congo descent
Rappers from Seine-Saint-Denis